DeForest Henry Perkins (December 24, 1872August 7, 1936) was an American educator, real estate developer, and political activist. A career educator, Perkins served as Superintendent of Portland Public Schools from 19111918. He was secretary of the Portland Chamber of Commerce from 19181921. Perkins was the Grand Dragon of the Ku Klux Klan in Maine from 1925 to 1928.  This was the high period of the Klan's ascendency nationally, and in Maine.  He resigned in 1928 after a Klan-backed Republican candidate for U.S. Senator, Ralph Owen Brewster, lost his primary contest to Sen. Frederick Hale, signaling the eclipse of the Klan as a force in Maine politics.

Personal and early life
Perkins was in North Brooksville, Maine to Charles N. Perkins and Ruth Grindle. His father was a sea captain, storekeeper, and farmer who served two terms in the Maine House of Representatives as a Republican. A Methodist, he attended East Maine Conference Seminary in Bucksport, Maine but left before graduating. He married Jennie Powers on August 1, 1900.

At the age of 18, Perkins was hired as a schoolteacher in Aroostook County, Maine. In the winter of 1896, Perkins joined the Freemasons. After teaching for six years, he returned to school himself when he enrolled at the University of Maine. Perkins was elected Sophomore Class President in 1897 despite being 25 years old. He graduated from Maine in 1900 with a Bachelor of Philosophy. Five years later, he earned a Master of Arts in History from Maine. He also attended summer schools at the University of Chicago and Indiana University. Perkins returned again to public education when he became principal of Freedom Academy in Freedom, Maine. He later became Superintendent of Schools first in Skowhegan & Madison, and then in Portland which was the largest school district in the state. In November 1910, he was elected President of the Maine Teachers' Association while working as the superintendent of schools of Madison, Maine and Skowhegan, Maine. He held the position as MTA president until the following year. He was also a serious candidate for Maine's Superintendent of Schools. In 1915, Sprague's Journal of Maine History described Perkins as "one of the ablest school officers 
in New England". In 1918 Perkins resigned his superintendency to become Executive Secretary of the Portland Chamber of Commerce.  He was also President of the Portland Rotary Club (1916–17), a Four Minute Man during World War I, and a board member of United Americans, a super-patriotic, anti-communist organization.

Ku Klux Klan and later life
In January 1925, Perkins spoke at a public hearing of the Maine Legislature regarding altering the direct nomination primary system. He claimed that “we are ready, the fight is on, and 10,000 Knights of the Ku Klux Klan will stand behind the Direct Primary.” Six months later in July 1925, he was publicly introduced as Grand Dragon of the Maine realm of the Ku Klux Klan. During his time in that position, the Klan focused primarily on influencing state politics. He was a staunch supporter of Governor Ralph Owen Brewster. In 1926, Perkins was accused of conspiring with the Republican Governor  and the Klan's Imperial Wizard, Hiram Wesley Evans in a Washington, D.C. hotel room, to sabotage the candidacy of a Republican candidate for the U.S. Senate, Arthur R. Gould. Brewster and Perkins denied the charge, and Gould was elected with an overwhelming majority. Brewster's subsequent primary loss to another anti-Klan candidate, Frederick Hale, in the next senatorial election of 1928 spelled the end of the Klan as an effective political force.

Perkins was involved in real estate speculation throughout the 1920s. When the building boom slowed at the end of the decade, Perkins lost most of his property to his partners or to foreclosure. Perkins spent the final six years of his life (1930-1936) as a resident of Paris, Maine (now West Paris), where he was a shopkeeper. He died of appendicitis in a Portland hospital in 1936 and is interred at Wayside Cemetery in West Paris.

See also
 Ku Klux Klan in Maine

References

1872 births
1936 deaths
People from Brooksville, Maine
People from Freedom, Maine
People from West Paris, Maine
Businesspeople from Portland, Maine
People from Skowhegan, Maine
Ku Klux Klan Grand Dragons
University of Maine alumni
Indiana University alumni
University of Chicago alumni
Activists from Maine
Educators from Portland, Maine
Schoolteachers from Maine
American Freemasons
East Maine Conference Seminary alumni
School superintendents in Maine
Ku Klux Klan in Maine